Kevin Brady (born 2 December 1962 in Dublin) is an Irish former footballer.

Brady played his schoolboy football with Stella Maris before joining Bohemian (2 spells), Shamrock Rovers, Derry City, Shelbourne and Dundalk in the League of Ireland. He also had a spell at Ards in the Irish League where he made 30 appearances.

Brady moved to Milltown in 1983 and was a vital part of the success over the next four years, making 140 total appearances scoring once. He won 4 League of Ireland titles, 3 FAI Cups and made 6 appearances in European competition for the Hoops. He also played for the League of Ireland XI in 7 Olympic qualifiers.

He transferred to Derry in July 1988 where he won the treble in 1989.

He signed for Shelbourne in 1991 and helped them win their first league title in his first season and won the FAI Cup with them the following season as they defeated Dundalk at Lansdowne Road. He moved on to Ards before returning to his first club Bohemians in the summer of 1995.

Brady re-signed for Derry in July 1997 and played in the Champions League qualifiers before signing for Dundalk a few months later.

Honours
 League of Ireland: 6
 Shamrock Rovers 1983/84, 1984/85, 1985/86, 1986/87
 Derry City 1988/89
 Shelbourne 1991/92
 FAI Cup: 5
 Shamrock Rovers 1985, 1986, 1987
 Derry City 1989
 Shelbourne 1993
 League of Ireland Cup
 Derry City 1988/89
LFA President's Cup: 2
 Shamrock Rovers - 1984/85, 1987/88

Sources 
 The Hoops by Paul Doolan and Robert Goggins
 The Four-in-a-Row Story by Robert Goggins

Association football defenders
Republic of Ireland association footballers
Bohemian F.C. players
Shamrock Rovers F.C. players
Derry City F.C. players
Shelbourne F.C. players
Ards F.C. players
Dundalk F.C. players
Association footballers from Dublin (city)
League of Ireland players
NIFL Premiership players
1962 births
Living people
League of Ireland XI players
Stella Maris F.C. players